The Abraham Lincoln Association (ALA) is an American association advancing studies on Abraham Lincoln and disseminating scholarship about Lincoln. The ALA was founded in 1908 to lead a national celebration of Lincoln's 100th birthday and continues to mark his birthday with an annual banquet and symposium. The ALA holds no archive of materials and instead functions primarily as a scholarly forum.  It remains "the nation's oldest and largest Lincoln organization."

History

The ALA was formed in 1908 as the Lincoln Centennial Association to help lead the national celebrations of Lincoln's one hundredth birthday. The ALA’s founders included United States Supreme Court Chief Justice Melville Weston Fuller, financier John Whitfield Bunn, United States Federal Judge J. Otis Humphrey, Speaker of the House Joseph G. Cannon, Illinois Governor Charles S. Deneen, Vice-President Adlai E. Stevenson, and Illinois Senator Shelby Cullom. 

In 1925, under the leadership of ALA President Logan Hay, Paul M. Angle became the ALA's first executive secretary. Angle led an effort in 1929 to change the organization's name to the Abraham Lincoln Association and, together with Benjamin Thomas and Harry Pratt, established the association's research and publication programs.

Under the leadership of president George W. Bunn, the ALA launched the Abraham Lincoln Quarterly, a scholarly publication that would replace prior ALA publications, and a massive project to collect and transcribe all of Abraham Lincoln’s known writings which eventually culminated in The Collected Works of Abraham Lincoln, edited by Roy P. Basler, Marion Dolores Pratt, and Lloyd A. Dunlap. It was published in 8 volumes (plus an index) between 1953 and 1955, with two supplemental volumes published in 1974 and 1990. The Collected Works of Abraham Lincoln found critical success but strained the ALA financially. Throughout the 1950s, 1960s, and 1970s the ALA continued undertaking various commemoration projects and engaging in scholarship.

In early 1995, several acclaimed historians—including Harold Holzer and then-ALA president Frank J. Williams—left the ALA board of directors and formed their own scholarly group, the Lincoln Forum, following "policy disagreements, alleged conflicts of interest, strong personalities and claims from out-of-town historians that they had been refused access to Lincoln materials." In 2005, with the opening of the Abraham Lincoln Presidential Library, scholars of both organizations came together to "mend damaged fences from what's been called a 'civil war' within the Lincoln academic community."

Governance
The ALA is governed by a board of directors made up of nationally-renowned Lincoln scholars and philanthropists dedicated to the ALA's cause. The ALA's board of directors include:

 Kenneth L. Anderson
 J. Steven Beckett
 Roger D. Billings, Jr.
 Justin A. Blandford
 Roger D. Bridges
 Julie Cellini
 Joshua Claybourn
 Robert J. Davis
 Christopher DeRose
 Jim Edgar
 Guy C. Fraker
 Donald D. Funk
 Sara Vaughn Gabbard
 Joseph E. Garrera
 Donald R. Graham
 Allen C. Guelzo
 Richard E. Hart
 Matthew Holden
 Erika Holst
 Devin Hunter
 David Joens
 Ron J. Keller
 Susan J. Koch
 Robert J. Lenz
 Dan Monroe
 Anne E. Moseley
 Karen (Keri) L. Nekrasz
 James W. Patton III
 Mark Pohlad
 Mark A. Plummer
 Roger D. Rudich
 William G. Shepherd
 Ronald D. Spears
 Brian J. Steenbergen
 Robert A. Stuart, Jr.
 James L. Swanson
 Louise Taper
 Donald R. Tracy
 Andy Van Meter
 Daniel R. Weinberg
 Jonathan W. White
 Barbara Wysocki

Publications

The ALA's semi-annual Journal of the Abraham Lincoln Association is the only journal devoted exclusively to the history and legacies of Abraham Lincoln. Historian David Herbert Donald said "The Journal of the Abraham Lincoln Association is the most important periodical in the field of Lincoln studies. As a Lincoln biographer, I rely on it heavily for both ideas and information." The ALA also publishes a quarterly newsletter, For the People. Most of the ALA's publications are available to the public on its website.

The ALA's crowning publication is The Collected Works of Abraham Lincoln, edited by Roy P. Basler, Marion Dolores Pratt, and Lloyd A. Dunlap. It was published in 8 volumes (plus an index) between 1953 and 1955, with two supplemental volumes published in 1974 and 1990 and is now available online to the public at the association's website. Basler’s Collected Works has become a standard resource for Lincoln and Civil War scholarship, but it suffers from limitations and omissions. Collected Works did not include incoming correspondence to Lincoln, which denies the reader important context. New technology and the development of documentary editing as a discipline allows for more faithful renditions of the texts. And in the nearly 60 years since the publication of Collected Works, many new Lincoln documents have been discovered, providing new opportunities for historical scholarship.

Events and programs

Banquet and symposium
The ALA hosts an annual banquet and symposium each year on Lincoln's birthday (February 12). Past speakers include Michael Beschloss (2008), Jon Meacham (2007 and 2022), and Doris Kearns Goodwin (2006). On February 12, 2009, President Barack Obama attended the ALA celebration as the guest of honor, giving a speech titled "What the People Need Done".

Awards
The ALA sponsors several awards, including the Spirit of Abraham Lincoln Award, the Logan Hay Medal, Lincoln the Lawyer Award, Hay-Nicolas Dissertation Prize Winner, and a Student Award.

The Hay-Nicolas Dissertation Prize recognizes and encourages young scholars who conduct research on Abraham Lincoln and his times. It is awarded each year by the ALA and Abraham Lincoln Institute to recognize the best dissertation dealing with Lincoln and his legacy. The ALA and Abraham Lincoln Institute select the recipients.

References

External links
 
Abraham Lincoln Association Serials 
Journal of the Abraham Lincoln Association (JALA)

Abraham Lincoln
1908 establishments in the United States
Historians of Abraham Lincoln